The Harțag is a left tributary of the river Buzău in Romania. Its source is in the Buzău Mountains. It flows into the Buzău downstream from Crasna.

References

Rivers of Romania
Rivers of Buzău County